This is a List of civilian trawlers requisitioned  by the Royal Navy for use in World War II. HMT stands for "His Majesty's Trawler".


A B C D E F G H I J K L M N O P Q R S T U V W X Y Z

Requisitioned trawlers, whalers and drifters;

A

B

C

D

E

F

G

H

I

J

K

L

M

N

O

P

Q

R

S

T

U

V

W

X

Y

Z

References

External links
 Naval Trawlers
 List of all trawlers lost during WW2

World War II, requisitioned
Trawlers, requisitioned
Trawlers, World War II, requisitioned
Trawlers, requisitioned
Trawlers